Alan Wray Tudyk (born March 16, 1971) is an American actor. His film work includes roles in 28 Days (2000), A Knight's Tale (2001), Dodgeball: A True Underdog Story (2004), voicing Sonny in I, Robot (2004), and 3:10 to Yuma (2007). In 2010, he starred with Tyler Labine in the black comedy horror film Tucker & Dale vs. Evil. He has also appeared in the films Transformers: Dark of the Moon (2011), 42 (2013), Maze Runner: The Scorch Trials (2015), and Trumbo (2015).

Tudyk is known for his television role as Wash on the space Western drama series Firefly with Nathan Fillion (2002–2003). The show only ran for one season but developed a cult following after the series aired. He reprised the role in the 2005 continuation film Serenity based on the events of the final episode of the series. His other television roles include the sitcom Arrested Development (2005, 2013, 2019), the science fiction series Dollhouse (2009–2010), superhero animated series Young Justice (2010–2013, 2019), and various voice roles on the animated series American Dad! (2011–present). From 2011–2014, he played Dr. Noah Werner on the sitcom Suburgatory with Jeremy Sisto. He also starred in Cartoon Network's television comedy Newsreaders (2014–2015), animated magical girl series Star vs. the Forces of Evil (2015–2019), voicing Dangerboat on The Tick (2017–2019), and voicing Eric Morden / Mr. Nobody on the series Doom Patrol (2019). Since 2019, he has voiced The Joker and Clayface in the DC Universe/HBO Max series Harley Quinn. Since 2021, he has starred as Dr. Harry Vanderspeigle in the Syfy series Resident Alien.

Early life
Tudyk was born in El Paso, Texas, the son of Betty Loyce (née Wiley) and Timothy Nicholas Tudyk. He is of Polish, German, French and English ancestry. Tudyk was raised in Plano, Texas, a suburb of Dallas, where he attended Plano Senior High School. He had a brief experience as a stand-up comic before quitting after an angry audience member threatened to kill him. Tudyk studied drama at the Methodist-affiliated Lon Morris College in Jacksonville, Texas, where he won the Academic Excellence award for drama. While in college, he played Beaver Smith in an eastern New Mexico summer stock theater production of Billy the Kid. Tudyk entered Juilliard but left in 1996 before earning a degree.

Career

Film
Tudyk's film debut was in 1997 in Mark Schwahn's independent drama film 35 Miles from Normal co-starring with Ethan Suplee. A year later, he had a minor role in the biographical comedy-drama Patch Adams with Robin Williams where he played patient Everton. Tudyk said of the role, that a doctor had given him a shot of adrenaline prior to filming as he had an allergic reaction to food the night before and his windpipe was closing up. In 2000, Tudyk played a gay German drug addict in 28 Days opposite Sandra Bullock. He played Wat in A Knight's Tale, Steve the Pirate in Dodgeball: A True Underdog Story and the emotional robot Sonny in I, Robot. In 2005, he reprised his role as the playful, easy-going Hoban "Wash" Washburne in the film Serenity, derived from the television series Firefly by Joss Whedon. In 2007, Tudyk had a supporting role as a strong-willed doctor in the western film 3:10 to Yuma. He had a brief but memorable role in the film Knocked Up and a highly physical comedic performance in the British film Death at a Funeral. Tudyk played Tucker in the indie horror comedy Tucker & Dale vs Evil. He reprised his role as Dutch for the film Transformers: Dark of the Moon. In Alvin and the Chipmunks: Chipwrecked, he voiced Simone (a reckless French accent speaking Chipmunk, the result after Simon was bitten by a spider). In 2012, Tudyk played Stephen A. Douglas in Timur Bekmambetov's film Abraham Lincoln: Vampire Hunter. He played Ben Chapman in the 2013 film 42 about Jackie Robinson.

In 2012, Tudyk voiced King Candy in the animated film Wreck-It Ralph, winning the Annie Award for Voice Acting. As of 2023, he has lent his voice to every Walt Disney Animation Studios film since. He voiced the Duke of Weselton in Frozen, Alistair Krei in Big Hero 6, Duke Weaselton in Zootopia, Heihei in Moana, KnowsMore in the Wreck-It Ralph sequel Ralph Breaks the Internet, Tuk Tuk and Pico the toucan in the 2021 films Raya and the Last Dragon and Encanto, respectively, and Duffle in Strange World. Additionally, in 2016, Tudyk played the droid K-2SO in Rogue One: A Star Wars Story, and provided the voice of the parrot, Iago (originally voiced by Gilbert Gottfried) in the 2019 live-action adaptation of Aladdin. 

Tudyk played Noel in Chris Blake's quarantine comedy film Distancing Socially, which was filmed remotely at the height of the pandemic using iPhone 11. It was acquired and released by Cinedigm in October 2021. He is set to play Mr. Darling in the upcoming fantasy adventure film Peter Pan & Wendy. It will stream on Disney+ in 2023.

Broadway
Tudyk made his Broadway debut for Epic Proportions in 1999. He was also in Wonder of the World, The Most Fabulous Story Ever Told, Misalliance, Oedipus and Bunny Bunny. Tudyk filled in for Hank Azaria's roles in Spamalot from June to December 2005, and starred in a limited run of Prelude to a Kiss.

Television

One of his better-known roles is the playful, easy-going Hoban "Wash" Washburne in the 2002 television series Firefly by Joss Whedon. Although the series ran for only one season, Universal Studios purchased the rights to make a film, Serenity, and Tudyk reprised his role. He did a few voices from Make Way for Noddy. In 2014, Tudyk took over the role of lead anchor on the live action adult swim comedy, Newsreaders.  Tudyk appeared as the cult leader, Father, in a two-part episode of Strangers With Candy entitled "Blank Stare". Among several guest spots on popular shows such as Arrested Development, he played a convicted child sex offender on a popular episode of CSI: Crime Scene Investigation. Tudyk was cast as a special guest star in Joss Whedon's Dollhouse. The show featured people whose personalities had been erased, with Tudyk portraying Alpha, a former "active" who accidentally downloaded 48 separate personalities. Alpha served as the main antagonist of the series' first season, with guest appearances in the show's second season. Tudyk also guest-starred in three episodes of ABC's modern remake of the television miniseries V. Tudyk provided the voice of superhero Green Arrow and villain Psimon in the animated series Young Justice. He also co-starred in the ABC comedy series Suburgatory as Noah Werner, a dentist from the city, who moves to the suburbs. Tudyk voiced Debbie the prostitute in season 3 of The Life and Times of Tim. He also provided the voices of Ludo Avarius and King River Butterfly in the Disney animated series Star vs the Forces of Evil.

In 2015, he released his own web series Con Man based loosely upon his experiences touring the convention circuit after the cancellation of Firefly. He was a main cast member of the DC Comics-based show Powerless.

In 2017, season 2 of Dirk Gently's Holistic Detective Agency saw Tudyk in the role of Mr. Priest, a somewhat rogue Blackwing operative who is on familiar terms with Dirk, Bart and the Rowdy 3. Tudyk is set to voice Optimus Prime in the upcoming Transformers: EarthSpark animated series.

Video games
Tudyk voiced an unnamed marine in Halo 3 and the squad's elite trooper in Halo 3: ODST. He, Nathan Fillion and Adam Baldwin gave their likenesses to each characters similar to Firefly. Tudyk voiced Green Arrow in Injustice: Gods Among Us and Injustice 2.

Personal life
Tudyk and choreographer Charissa Barton became engaged in December 2015. They married on September 24, 2016.

Filmography

Film

Television

Video games

Theatre

Web

Awards and nominations
Nominated for the MTV Movie Award for Best On-Screen Team for Dodgeball: A True Underdog Story (2004)
Nominated for the Screen Actors Guild Award for Outstanding Performance by a Cast in a Motion Picture for 3:10 to Yuma (2007)
Won the Annie Award for Voice Acting in a Feature Production for Wreck-It Ralph (2012)
Nominated for the Critics' Choice Movie Award for Best Acting Ensemble for Trumbo (2015)
Nominated for the Screen Actors Guild Award for Outstanding Performance by a Cast in a Motion Picture for Trumbo (2015)
Nominated for a Primetime Emmy Award for Outstanding Actor in a Short Form Comedy or Drama Series for Con Man (2017)

 Bibliography 

Con Man ComicsSpectrum #0–1 (script 2016)

Star WarsStar Wars Adventures Vol. 2: Unexpected Detour (K-2SO's Dialogue writer 2018,)

References

External links

 
 
 "Stage and Screen Star to Fill in for Azaria on Monty Python's Spamalot During Actor's Hiatus", from the Playbill'' website
 Alan Tudyk at FEARnet

1971 births
Living people
20th-century American male actors
21st-century American male actors
American male film actors
American male stage actors
American male television actors
American male video game actors
American male voice actors
American people of English descent
American people of French descent
American people of German descent
American people of Polish descent
Animal impersonators
Annie Award winners
Disney people
Pixar people
Juilliard School alumni
Lon Morris College alumni
Male motion capture actors
Male actors from El Paso, Texas
Male actors from Texas
People from El Paso, Texas
People from Plano, Texas
Theatre World Award winners